As of the 2010 census, its population was 10,007 and it contained 4,394 housing units.

 

Stookey Township is a township located in St. Clair County, Illinois. It is an unincorporated part of Belleville, Illinois located just west of downtown Belleville, for that reason it is often referred to by locals as Belleville West. Residential homes and small businesses occupy the region along with occasional shopping centers (Belleville Crossing). The township rides along Illinois Route 13 and converges with Illinois Route 15 and Illinois Route 159. The ZIP codes for the township is 62223 & 62260. The telephone area code of the township is 618.

Politics 
Stookey Township is governed by a Board of Trustees, a Township Supervisor, an assessor, clerk, and Highway commissioner.

Mark Bagby is the Township Supervisor.

Frazier Garner is the Town Clerk.

Brian Reed is the Highway Commissioner.

Stan Seiron is the Assessor of mobile homes.

Ryan Stookey, Dan Weaver, Jim Lougeay, and Al Scharf are the current Trustees.

Geography

Transportation

One MetroLink light rail station, Memorial Station, and about two dozen MetroBus stops are located around the Township.

The Illinois West-Central Railway also runs through the township in which supply and cargo freight trains run through at least a few times a day on the way to Chicago, IL, Saint Louis, MO, or East Saint Louis, IL.

The closest airport to Stookey Township is the Mid-America Airport, which is about 12 miles to the east of the township. The closest major international airport is Lambert-Saint Louis International Airport which is west of Saint Louis, MO and about 25 miles away.

Demographics

2017 Census 

As of the 2017 Census, there were 9,496 people, 3,786 households At 2.5 persons per household.
The median age is 43.

The racial makeup was 81% White, 15% African American, 2% Hispanic, and 1% from two or more races. The population is 52% female.

Belleville Crossing

Belleville Crossing is a shopping center and retail/business plaza that was constructed by the Desco Group under the contractor Impact Strategies. The first stores opened in this plaza in October, 2007 as phase I which included Target, Home Depot, Pet Smart, OfficeMax, and Mattress Firm as the anchor occupants along with many other smaller shops occupying the plaza. Other phases continued soon after. These include Buffalo Wild Wings, Qdoba, and a Walgreens that opened early in 2009. A White Castle and a Wendy's opened in the Spring of 2009. Other smaller strip malls were completed by Fall/Winter 2009. St. Louis Bread Company opened a new location here, relocating from downtown Belleville, in December 2016; followed by Burger King September 2017; and Popeyes opened August 2018.  A movie theater and possible Hampton Inn hotel were envisioned to be finished by Summer 2010 but construction has yet to start.

While technically annexed by Belleville Township proper (City of Belleville), it is located in the heart of Stookey Township near the new Belleville West High School at the intersection of Illinois Route 15, and Frank Scott Parkway. Also many consumers that shop at this shopping center are from Stookey Township and surrounding areas. The shopping center also presently supplies the township and surrounding area with over 600 retail related jobs both full and part-time. It is expected to bring 1500 to 1750 jobs to the region all together when the shopping center is completed by the end of 2010.

Sites of interest
Hofbrauhaus St. Louis
Belle Clair Fairgrounds Park
National Shrine of Our Lady of the Snows
Skyview Drive-in Theatre
Belleville Crossing Shopping Plaza
4204 Main Street Brewing Co.

Education

The main public high school that serves the area is Belleville West High School which was, in 2003, moved from its old location at 2600 West Main Street (now Lindenwood University's Belleville Campus) to its new location at 4063 Frank Scott Parkway West.

Public schools 
Belleville School District 118
Abe Lincoln School, 820 Royal Heights Rd., Belleville IL 62226
Central Jr. High School, 1801 Central School Rd., Belleville, IL  62220
Douglas School, 125 Carlyle Ave., Belleville, IL  62220
Franklin School, 301 N. 2nd St., Belleville, IL  62220
Henry Raab School, 1120 Union Ave., Belleville, IL  62220
Jefferson School, 1400 N. Charles St., Belleville, IL 62221
Roosevelt School, 700 West Cleveland, Belleville, IL  62220
Union School, 20 S. 27th St., Belleville, IL  62220
Washington School, 400 South Charles, Belleville, IL  62220
Westhaven School, 118 Westhaven School Rd., Belleville, IL  62220
West Jr. High School, 840 Royal Heights Rd., Belleville, IL  62226
Belleville Township High School District 201
Belleville West High School, 4063 Frank Scott Parkway West, Belleville, IL 62223
Belleville East High School, 2555 West Blvd., Belleville, IL 62221
Harmony-Emge District 175
Ellis Elementary, 250 Illini Dr., Belleville, IL 62223
Harmony Intermediate, 7401 Westchester Dr, Belleville, IL 62223
Emge Junior High, 7401 Westchester Dr, Belleville, IL 62223
Signal Hill School District 181, 40 Signal Hill Place, Belleville, Illinois 62223
Millstadt District 160, 211 W Mill Street, Millstadt IL 62260

Private schools
Althoff Catholic High School, 5401 West Main St., Belleville, IL 62226
Our Lady Queen of Peace School, 5915 North Belt West, Belleville, IL 62223

Higher education
Saint Louis University Belleville Campus
Lindenwood University Belleville Campus
Southwestern Illinois College

Public utilities 
Utility companies that work in the area are the Ameren IP Company (providing both electricity and natural gas), the Illinois-American Water Company, Stookey Township Sewer and Belleville Sewage.  Since Stookey Township isn't officially part of Belleville, it does not receive city trash service—several public and privately owned trash collection companies are available to choose from.  Residents must contact a collection company to set up deals on trash collection.  Citizens of Stookey also cannot get library cards or check out books at Belleville libraries.  No libraries exist so far in Stookey Township.  Stookey township citizens are protected by the Signal Hill and Villa Hills volunteer fire departments and the St. Clair County Sheriff, but Belleville city police do not have jurisdiction in Stookey Township.

Notable people
Jenny Bindon - Goalkeeper for the New Zealand Women's Football Team at the 2007 Women's World Cup and 2008 Summer Olympics in Beijing; grew up in Stookey Township.
Jay Farrar - musician and songwriter; lived in Stookey Township.
Fred Keck - Illinois state representative and farmer; born in Stookey Township.

References

External links
Stookey Township Official Website
City-data.com
St. Clair County Official Site
Illinois State Archives

Townships in St. Clair County, Illinois
Townships in Illinois